Wolf-Dieter Schneider (born October 2, 1942) is a German metallurgist, manager of the foundry industry and university professor.

Life 
Wolf-Dieter Schneider was born on October 2, 1942 in Berlin, Germany.

He studied foundry science at RWTH Aachen University and the Technical University of Berlin. In 1965 he obtained his diploma in Berlin. In 1969 he became a Doktoringenieur (Dr.-Ing.) at the Foundry Institute of the Technical University of Berlin. PhD. He then took on tasks in the German foundry industry. Initially in managerial positions at Rheinstahl Hüttenwerke, he was appointed Technical Director of August Engels GmbH in Velbert in 1982 and two years later he was appointed to the Executive Board of Thyssen Guss AG. In 1989 he changed to the management of the Otto Junker GmbH in Simmerath as chairman. Between 1993 and 1995 he was significantly involved in the restructuring of the foundry industry in the new federal states for the Treuhandanstalt in Berlin. He was then managing director of M.I.M Hüttenwerke Duisburg, chairman of the board of Deutsche Gießerei- und Industrie-Holding AG (DIHAG) and later chairman of the supervisory board.

In 2000 he worked for the Federal Ministry of Education and Research as an expert in the field of innovative environmental technologies in the metal production and foundry industry. In 2007 the Freiberg University of Mining and Technology appointed him honorary professor. He taught modern management methods in foundry operations.

With his wife Ursula who died in 2017, he set up the foundation fund Ursula and Prof. Dr. Wolf-Dieter Schneider to promote research and teaching in engineering and economics in Freiberg in 2006 or 2007.

Schneider is a Weinheim Corps student. In 1964 he joined the Corps Albingia Dresden in Aachen and, after moving to Berlin, the Corps Cheruscia. Today he is the old man of the Corps Marko-Guestphalia Aachen and Cheruscia Berlin.

Fonts 

 Untersuchungen des Kristallisationsablaufs von Eisen und Eisenlegierungen im Hochtemperaturmikroskop, 1969

References

External links 

 Wolf-Dieter Schneider zum neuen Honorarprofessor bestellt, Pressemitteilung (press release) of the TU-Freiberg from October 19, 2007

1942 births
Living people
German metallurgists
Technical University of Berlin alumni
Academic staff of the Freiberg University of Mining and Technology